Louis Bennett (died March 30, 1959) was an American lawyer and politician from New York.

Life
Bennett was an Assistant U.S. Attorney for the Southern and Eastern Districts of New York, and the District of New Jersey.

He was a member of the New York State Assembly from 1939 to 1948, sitting in the 162nd, 163rd, 164th, 165th and 166th New York State Legislatures.

He was a member of the  New York State Senate (26th D.) in 1949. He resigned his seat on July 22, 1949, to run for the New York City Municipal Court.

He was a justice of the Municipal Court from 1950 until his death in 1959.

He died on March 30, 1959 and was buried in Mount Carmel Cemetery in Flushing, Queens.

Sources

External links
 

Year of birth missing
1959 deaths
Democratic Party New York (state) state senators
Politicians from the Bronx
New York (state) state court judges
Democratic Party members of the New York State Assembly